Chitunda or Cotunda is a populated place in western Angola. The following table is a climate table average for Chitunda:

References 

Angola